is the twelfth studio album by Japanese girl group Morning Musume.

Overview
It is the last album to feature Ai Takahashi, Risa Niigaki, and Aika Mitsui and the first to feature the ninth-generation members Mizuki Fukumura, Erina Ikuta, Riho Sayashi, and Kanon Suzuki.

Track listing

Personnel
Kaoru Okubo - Keyboard and Programming (1,2,3,4,8,11)
Ai Takahashi - Chorus (1,2,3,5,6,7,8,9,10,11,12)
Risa Niigaki - Chorus (1,6)
Koji Kamada - Guitar (2,7,8,12), Electric Guitar and Air Guitar (5)
U.M.E.D.Y - Rap (3)
Sayumi Michishige - Chorus (4)
Shōichirō Hirata - Programming (5,7)
Tsunku - Chorus (5,12)
AKIRA - Programming (6)
Shunsuke Suzuki - Programming and Guitar (9)
Takao Toshiyuki - Drums (9)
Yuusuke Itagaki - Programming and Guitar (10)
Masanori Takumi - Programming, Guitar and Bass (12)

Charts

References

External links
12, Smart at the official Hello! Project discography

2011 albums
Morning Musume albums
Zetima albums
Albums produced by Tsunku
Japanese-language albums
Electropop albums
Dance-pop albums by Japanese artists